Maksym Lopyryonok (born 13 April 1995) is a professional Ukrainian football defender who plays for LNZ Cherkasy.

Career
Lopyryonok is a product of the UFK Dnipropetrovsk and FC Dnipro youth sportive school systems. His first trainers were Volodymyr Herashchenko and Kostyantyn Pavlyuchenko.

He made his debut for FC Dnipro in the match against FC Stal Kamianske on 30 October 2016 in the Ukrainian Premier League as a main-squad player.

References

External links
 

1995 births
Living people
Footballers from Dnipro
Ukrainian footballers
Ukrainian expatriate footballers
FC Dnipro players
SC Dnipro-1 players
FC Mynai players
FC Istiklol players
FC LNZ Cherkasy players
Ukrainian Premier League players
Ukrainian expatriate sportspeople in Tajikistan
Expatriate footballers in Tajikistan

Association football defenders
Ukraine youth international footballers
Ukrainian First League players
Ukrainian Second League players